James Wallace Tayor Guthrie (born 6 June 1912- died 10 September 1981) was a Scottish footballer who played for Luncarty City Boys, Perth Thistle F.C. and Scone Thistle before joining Dundee for the 1932/33 season. In August 1937 he was transferred to Portsmouth of the English First Division for a fee of £4,000.

References

External links
Profile on "Names that will live forever"

1912 births
1981 deaths
Scottish footballers
Dundee F.C. players
Portsmouth F.C. players
Crystal Palace F.C. players
Footballers from Perth and Kinross
Scottish Football League players
English Football League players
Association football midfielders
FA Cup Final players